Cyma SA is a Swiss manufacturer of luxury wristwatches, founded by brothers Joseph and Theodore Schwob in 1862. By 1908, Cyma was advertising the resilience of their timepieces when exposed to electricity, magnetism and varying temperatures. The company is currently owned by Stelux International, Ltd. a Hong Kong-based holdings firm which invests primarily in fine jewellery and watches, and is overseen by fellow Fédération de L'industrie Horlogère Suisse member Universal Genève.

History

The Schwob brothers named the company cyma, a Latin word meaning "sprout", and the origin of the French "cime" or summit. In early years, the company had a staff of 40 people and 55 machines that together produced about 40 watches a day. However, it was not until 1892 in which the brothers partnered with Frédéric Henri Sandoz, the owner of the watch wholesale company, Henri Sandoz et Cie, that the business expanded. Under Sandoz's leadership, the company became the Cyma Watch Company and built the Cyma factory in La Chaux-de-Fonds, Switzerland in the Jura Mountains, near Le Locle. Both towns had been the center of the Swiss watchmaking industry during the 19th century.

The company is currently located in Le Locle and is provincially managed by Claude and Françoise Guilgot. On 9 September 2010, Cyma SA and E-Watch organised an event in Yverdon to launch their new brand collection: Myriad.

Price and value

Cyma watches from the 1950s retailed between approximately $400 and $25,000 (figures adjusted to 2010 inflation).

References

Manufacturing companies established in 1862
Watch manufacturing companies of Switzerland
Swiss watch brands
Luxury brands
High fashion brands
Swiss companies established in 1862